The 2020–21 Fenerbahçe S.K. season was the club's 63rd consecutive season in the Süper Lig and their 112th year in existence.

Club

Board of Directors 
You can see the fields of the board members by moving the pointer to the dotted field.

Staff 
The list of the staff is below.

Facilities 

|}

Kits
Fenerbahçe's 2020–21 kits, manufactured by Adidas, appeared on 6 August 2020 for the first time on new transferred footballers and were up for sale on 12 August 2020.

Supplier: Adidas
Main sponsor: Avis

Back sponsor: Halley
Sleeve sponsor: HeForShe, Tüpraş

Short sponsor: Aygaz
Socks sponsor: Nesine.com

Players

First-team squad

|-
|colspan=12 align=center|Players sold or loaned out after the start of the season

Transfers

In

Out

Total spending:  €14.60M 

Total income:  €23.10M 

Expenditure:  €8.50M

Pre-season and friendlies

Pre-season

Mid-season

Competitions

Overview

Süper Lig

League table

Results summary

Pld = Matches played; W = Matches won; D = Matches drawn; L = Matches lost; GF = Goals for; GA = Goals against; GD = Goal difference; Pts = Points

Results by round

Matches

Turkish Cup

Statistics

Appearances and goals

|-
! colspan=14 style=background:#dcdcdc; text-align:center| Goalkeepers

|-
! colspan=14 style=background:#dcdcdc; text-align:center| Defenders

|-
! colspan=14 style=background:#dcdcdc; text-align:center| Midfielders

|-
! colspan=14 style=background:#dcdcdc; text-align:center| Forwards

|-
! colspan=14 style=background:#dcdcdc; text-align:center| Players transferred/loaned out during the season

|}
 Last updated: 15 May 2021.

Goalscorers

 Last updated: 15 May 2021.

Assists

 Last updated: 15 May 2021.

Clean sheets

 Last updated: 15 May 2021.

Disciplinary record

 Last updated: 15 May 2021.

References

Fenerbahçe S.K. (football) seasons
Fenerbahce